The Scotland national women's lacrosse team represents Scotland at women's lacrosse. It is governed by Lacrosse Scotland.

Women's Lacrosse World Cup Past Results

1982
 1st  United States 
 2nd  Australia 
 3rd  Canada 
 4th  Scotland 
 5th  England 
 6th  Wales

1986
 1st  Australia 
 2nd  United States 
 3rd  Scotland 
 4th  Canada 
 5th  England 
 6th  Wales

1989
 1st  United States 
 2nd  England 
 3rd  Australia 
 4th  Canada 
 5th  Scotland 
 6th  Wales

1993
 1st  United States 
 2nd  England 
 3rd  Australia 
 4th  Canada 
 5th  Scotland 
 6th  Wales 
 7th  Japan 
 8th  Czech Republic

1997
 1st  United States 
 2nd  Australia 
 3rd  England 
 4th  Wales 
 5th  Canada 
 6th  Scotland 
 7th  Japan

2001
 1st  United States 
 2nd  Australia 
 3rd  England 
 4th  Canada 
 5th  Wales 
 6th  Scotland 
 7th  Japan 
 8th  Germany

2005
 1st Australia
 2nd United States
 3rd England
 4th Canada
 5th Japan
 6th Wales
 7th Scotland
 8th Czech Republic
 9th Germany
 10th New Zealand

2009

Teams were split into three separate pools. Pool B consisted of Wales, Scotland, Czech Republic, Germany and New Zealand, who played round robins games against each team in their pool seeding for the quarterfinals. The quarterfinals were followed up by consolation games, the semifinals, and the bronze and gold medal games. Scotland lost to Australia 17–4 in the quarterfinals.

References

Scotland women's
Lacrosse
National lacrosse teams
Women's lacrosse in the United Kingdom
Women's lacrosse teams